Leernes is a village of Wallonia and a district of the municipality of Fontaine-l'Évêque, located in the province of Hainaut, Belgium.

External links

Former municipalities of Hainaut (province)